Nancy Kleniewski is an American sociologist and academic administrator who served as the president of the State University of New York at Oneonta.

Career 
Kleniewski was a sociologist and held administrative posts at the University of Massachusetts Lowell and the State University of New York at Geneseo. She was provost and vice president for academic affairs at Bridgewater State College. From 2008 to 2018, Kleniewski was president of the State University of New York at Oneonta. She was the first female in that role at Oneonta.

Personal life 
Kleniewski was raised in Rhode Island. She is married to Bill Davis. They moved to coastal Rhode Island after her retirement in 2018.

Selected works

References 

Living people
Heads of universities and colleges in the United States
Women heads of universities and colleges
Place of birth missing (living people)
State University of New York at Oneonta faculty
American women sociologists
American sociologists
University of Massachusetts Lowell faculty
State University of New York at Geneseo faculty
Bridgewater State University faculty
Academics from Rhode Island
20th-century social scientists
21st-century social scientists
20th-century American women scientists
21st-century American women scientists
Scientists from Rhode Island
Year of birth missing (living people)
20th-century American academics
21st-century American academics